The 1976 Memphis State Tigers football team represented Memphis State University (now known as the University of Memphis) as an independent during the 1976 NCAA Division I football season. In its second season under head coach Richard Williamson, the team compiled an 7–4 record and outscored opponents by a total of 241 to 182. The team played its home games at Liberty Bowl Memorial Stadium in Memphis, Tennessee. 

The team's statistical leaders included Lloyd Patterson with 1,563 passing yards and 42 points scored, Terdell Middleton with 919 rushing yards, Ricky Rivas with 529 receiving yards.

Schedule

References

Memphis State
Memphis Tigers football seasons
Memphis State Tigers football